The Shieli-Telikol Canal, also known as "Shieli Canal" and "Telikol Canal", is an irrigation canal in the Kyzylorda Region, Kazakhstan. It connects the Telikol lakes with Shieli.

Geography
The canal begins in the Telikol lacustrine area at the mouth of the Sarysu river in the north.

References

External links
Contribution to OECD Country Programme for Kazakhstan - Strengthening the Role of Multi-Purpose Water Infrastructure (Annex)
The Assessment of Irrigated Land Salinization in the Aral Sea Region
Syr Darya basin
Canals in Kazakhstan
Irrigation canals
Kyzylorda Region